The 2009 Western Bulldogs season was the club's 84th since their introduction to the AFL in 1925.

Season summary 
The Western Bulldogs were coming off their most successful season in 10 years by making the preliminary final in 2008 and finished 3rd overall in 2009.

The club's only first round pick in the 2009 AFL Draft was at 15, and with it the Bulldogs selected Glenelg midfielder Christian Howard.

Fixtures 
The bulldogs made two trips to Western Australia in the first four rounds, and then played three games at the MCG. They went on to also play a home game in Canberra against Sydney and a home game in Darwin against Port Adelaide.

The NAB Cup 

ladder position = -

Regular season 

ladder position = 2

 
ladder position = 2

 
ladder position = 2

 
ladder position = 3

 
ladder position = 5

 
ladder position = 6

 
ladder position =  3

 
ladder position = 3

 
ladder position = 3

 
ladder position = 3

 
ladder position = 3

 
ladder position = 3

 
ladder position = 3

 
ladder position = 3

Ladder

References

External links
 Western Bulldogs Official Site

Western Bulldogs Season, 2009
Western Bulldogs seasons
Western Bulldogs Season, 2009